Based in Wichita, Kansas, Youth Entrepreneurs (YE) is a 501(c)(3) non-profit charitable educational organization. Their stated goal is to provide entrepreneurship education to students in middle and high school, inspiring “students to overcome barriers and seize opportunities for the betterment of themselves and others.”

Origin
In 1991, Liz and Charles Koch founded Youth Entrepreneurs, originally an eight-week course at a Wichita high school.  By 2019, the organization had grown to a presence in over 126 schools throughout the United States.

Goals and operations
Youth Entrepreneurs states that their major objective is to provide high school students, particularly at-risk students, with business and entrepreneurial education, focusing primarily on three objectives:  
 Providing students with the knowledge and skills necessary to start their own businesses
 Teaching students how to apply those entrepreneurial skills to become better employees, and
 Encouraging students to continue onto higher education

YE cites the following “Foundational Values” as the key to student success: Responsibility, Be Principled, Knowledge, Freedom, Passion, Opportunity, Sound Judgment and Win-Win Focus.”

Currently, the organization offers year-round high school classes about economics with an emphasis on "free market principles" and practical business skills.

After 2010, the organization began offering YA students college credits through the organization's partnership with Butler Community College and other higher learning institutions, in the hopes of helping students to "get a head start on their 
college career".  Like the high school classes, these college-level courses are aimed at providing business training.

Classes that run through the school year are supplemented by summer camps. The summer camp at Dodge City High School in Dodge City, Kansas, for example, aims to provide students with an interactive and exciting way to practice business principles, including by competing for cash prizes and receiving feedback for business ideas that students present.

In 2011, YE awarded $100,000 in scholarship money to YE alumni to pursue 4-year degrees.  YE also supports alumni through mentorship programs, ensuring that they have a support structure including continuing education and networking to aid them in breaking into the business world.

Controversy

The YE program has been criticized for being a platform to disseminate the Koch philosophy.  Charles and his brother David Koch were longtime supporters of the Libertarian Party before becoming Republican kingpins.  In 1980 and at the beginning of the Reagan era, the Libertarian platform proposed a drastic revision of the American education system: "We advocate the complete separation of education and state. Government schools lead to the indoctrination of children and interfere with the free choice of individuals. Government ownership, operation, regulation, and subsidy of schools and colleges should be ended."

YE High School posters target predominantly poor students with the premise of receiving generous financial incentives including startup capital and scholarships after graduation.  YE classes are disguised as typical high school business courses, taught in public schools by a certified teacher.  But they are actually guided by Youth Entrepreneurs, with lesson plans and class materials promoting the Koch Industries free-market Libertarian ideology.  Course information includes: The minimum wage hurts workers and slows economic growth.  Low taxes and less regulation allow people to prosper.  Public assistance harms the poor.  Government, in short, is the enemy of liberty.

Importance
Analysts recognize entrepreneurship as an essential part of economic development, and is especially necessary in areas like the Midwestern United States that have been hit hardest by recent economic recession.

Education analyst Dr. Steve Wyckoff said of YEK's role in the rehabilitation of the economy of the Midwest,

One of the major issues we have in rural America is the shortage of jobs and businesses. If we can find those students across rural America who have a passion that can be applied in a local business, we can grow our own jobs. We're never going to get businesses to move to rural Kansas in sufficient numbers to solve the problem. It's imperative for the survival of rural America that we begin to grow our own jobs.

YEK works in partnership with the Network For Teaching Entrepreneurship, another international nonprofit organization dedicated to providing entrepreneurship programs to young people from low-income communities.

References

External links
 
 Organizational Profile – National Center for Charitable Statistics (Urban Institute)

Non-profit organizations based in Kansas
Educational organizations based in the United States
Organizations based in Wichita, Kansas
501(c)(3) organizations
Organizations established in 1991
1991 establishments in Kansas
Youth organizations based in Kansas